We'll Be Together may refer to:

 "We'll Be Together" (Sting song)
 "We'll Be Together" (Sandra song)
 "We'll Be Together", a song by singer/actress Ashley Tisdale on her solo album, Headstrong
 "We'll Be Together", a song from the 1982 musical film Grease 2

See also
 "Someday We'll Be Together", a 1961 R&B/soul song, notably covered by Diana Ross & the Supremes in 1969